Am-Dam Airport  is a public-use airport located near Am-Dam, Sila, Chad.

See also
List of airports in Chad

References

External links 
 Airport record for Am-Dam Airport at Landings.com

Airports in Chad
Sila Region